Sacket Run is a stream in the U.S. state of Ohio. It is a tributary to the Little Muskingum River.

A variant name is "Sackett Run". The stream was named after a local hunter with the surname Sackett.

References

Rivers of Ohio
Rivers of Monroe County, Ohio
Rivers of Washington County, Ohio